Epidemiology is a bi-monthly, peer-reviewed journal for epidemiologic research, published by Lippincott Williams & Wilkins. 

The journal publishes original research from all fields of epidemiology, as well as review articles, meta-analyses, novel hypotheses, descriptions and applications of new methods and discussions of research theory and public health policy. It is the official journal of the International Society for Environmental Epidemiology (ISEE).  In 2020, Epidemiology had an impact factor of 4.822, ranking 35th among 203 journals in the field of public, environmental and occupational health.

Epidemiology was founded by Ken Rothman in 1990. Allen Wilcox has been Editor-in-Chief since 2001. Its editorial offices are in Durham, North Carolina.

References

Epidemiology journals
Lippincott Williams & Wilkins academic journals
Bimonthly journals
English-language journals
Publications established in 1990